Back Blast is the fifth novel by Mark Greaney, published on February 16, 2016, by Berkley Books. It is also the fifth book in the Gray Man series. In this novel, Court Gentry's search for the reasons behind the shoot-on-sight sanction imposed on him by the Central Intelligence Agency continues as he investigates his last CIA mission, Operation Back Blast.

Plot summary 
After five years of being on the run overseas from the Central Intelligence Agency, Court Gentry comes to Washington, D.C., to seek answers about him being burned by the CIA. With Court surfacing in the nation's capital, CIA National Clandestine Service (NCS) head Denny Carmichael, who has been hunting him for five years through the Violator Working Group, organizes a citywide manhunt, fearing that he has come to exact revenge on him for the sanction. Among the new players in the hunt is Suzanne Brewer, a CIA senior officer whose expertise is the security of the agency. Carmichael also enlists the help of Saudi intelligence through its Washington station chief, Murquin "Kaz" al-Kazaz, as well as Court's former team leader from the CIA Golf Sierra paramilitary force, Zack Hightower.

Meanwhile, private contractor Townsend Government Services head Leland Babbitt has been attempting to make amends with Carmichael after the botched Gentry operation in Europe months ago. When Carmichael still refuses, Babbitt storms into the nearby United States Capitol building, threatening to leak classified CIA material to the United States Congress, but he was later stopped by Carmichael's foot soldiers and was brought to Langley. In order to prevent him from further whistleblowing top-secret intelligence operations, Carmichael brings Babbitt and his company back into the hunt for Gentry. However, still viewing him as a danger to their operation, Carmichael and his deputy head Jordan Mayes secretly arrange Babbitt's assassination, to be orchestrated by Hightower and later to be blamed on Gentry.

That night, Gentry was surveilling Babbitt's residence when Babbitt was killed by Hightower with a sniper rifle. Gentry then finds himself pursued by Babbitt's security force and later by some Joint Special Operations Command (JSOC) operatives, who were sent by the CIA upon news of Babbitt's assassination to hunt down Gentry, as he escapes from the compound and later from a shootout at a McDonald's restaurant. As he is fleeing the scene, he was shot by D.C. police officers, who were in fact Saudi-based assassins sent by Kaz, along the Washington Beltway. Even though wounded, he manages to carjack a cab and flee the scene.

The next night, CIA Special Activities Division (SAD) head Matthew Hanley, who was the control officer of the Golf Sierra paramilitary force and Carmichael's rival, was visited in his house by Gentry, who wanted information about the sanction. Hanley reveals that Carmichael, the unnamed CIA director and then-CIA chief counsel Max Ohlhauser ordered the shoot-on-sight directive on Gentry five years ago because he killed the wrong guy in his last CIA operation, Operation Back Blast, which was in Trieste, Italy just a year ago. As a result, Gentry has procured new information, but is still unsure of the Hanley's reason; his theory was that Carmichael wanted him dead because he was the last member of the now-disbanded Autonomous Asset Program (AAP), a top secret assassination program Gentry entered years ago before joining the CIA, and which Carmichael apparently wanted to be kept under wraps. Hanley warns Gentry that he will not accomplish anything in a one-man war against the CIA for the sanction, and that Carmichael has more power in the agency than anyone else, but Gentry vows to continue on his mission and leaves Hanley's residence.

Gentry later thwarts an armed robbery on a convenience store that he has been frequenting for his supplies, which attracts the attention of the CIA as well as Catherine King and Andy Shoal, investigative reporters for The Washington Post. Therefore, they deduce that the man who stopped the robbery and the man who raided the drug den nights before are the same person and that he is not possibly the triggerman in Babbitt's assassination.

Later in the afternoon, Court tracks down Ohlhauser, who is now a private lawyer and CNN commentator, and forces him to give him more information about the shoot-on-sight directive, while boarding a train into the Dupont Circle subway station. Aside from the revelation that the AAP had been reorganized and is still operational, Gentry is still frustrated with lack of new information and lets him go. Unfortunately, JSOC operatives learn of Gentry's presence in the subway station through facial recognition, and as a result the Saudi Arabian assassins arrive there first. Ohlhauser, oblivious to their true identities, leads them to Gentry, and they arrest him. Gentry, suspicious of his captors, later gets into a firefight with them, killing one and injuring five of the hitmen. Ohlhauser is later accidentally killed by the Middle Eastern assassins. Gentry escapes the subway station.

Meanwhile, in Israel, Mossad operative Yanis Alvey has been placed under house arrest for aiding in the escape of Gentry from Europe. On the fifth day of his confinement, his boss Menachem Aurbach visits and frees him. He reveals Alvey the reason why helping the Gray Man enter the United States is a dishonor to their country. Years ago, Mossad had been successfully running a deep-penetration agent in Al Qaeda, codenamed Hawthorn. It was later hinted that Gentry shot Hawthorn in Trieste, which was likely the reason for the shoot-on-sight order for him.

Later that night in his home, Gentry tries to remember Operation Back Blast from six years ago. He alone was assigned by the CIA to rescue an Israeli deep-penetration agent in Al Qaeda, whose real identity was compromised, in the course of a meeting in Trieste between the AQ and Serbian arms dealers in order to secure weapons for the former. He remembers an Al Qaeda assassin who attempted to kill the Israeli agent in their safehouse on the night of his rescue, but he killed the gunman and together, they escaped. Gentry was further convinced that Carmichael used the rescue operation as justification for the shoot-on-sight order.

A Crime Stoppers tip leads the D.C. Emergency Response Team to Gentry's house, forcing him to abandon his shelter and evade capture. After finding a home in an abandoned Civil War-era grain mill outside D.C. the next day, he stumbles upon an online Washington Post article by King about an ex-military assassin terrorizing Washington, D.C., that he read was sourced by certain CIA personnel. He decides to meet King, but later deduces correctly that Carmichael helped King in her article to use her as bait in order to kill him. He decides to pursue whoever is tailing King.

Later, he discovers that Hightower, his old team leader from CIA, was the one tailing King, and abducts him. Back in Gentry's new shelter, Hightower tells Gentry about his current work with the CIA, as well as revealing that he killed Babbitt, and then tries to convince him that he is on his side. The next day, Gentry lets him go with the assurance that he will not tell Carmichael but Hanley about what happened as well as informing him about the Middle Eastern actors who have been assisting in the manhunt operation for him.

Meanwhile, in the midst of the fallout from her doctored Washington Post article which was intended by Carmichael to be the CIA's official version of the events, King receives a mysterious e-mail message, arranging a clandestine meeting for more information about her article. This turns out to be Gentry, who tells her everything he knew about his predicament. He later asks her for information about their meeting with Carmichael; the D/NCS had told her that Gentry was born Jacksonville, Florida, which Gentry interprets as a threat. They later part ways, as King promises to go to Israel for more information from Alvey. Gentry decides to go to Florida to find his estranged father before Carmichael and the Middle Eastern assassins kidnap him.

Arriving in his hometown, Glen St. Mary, Florida, where he spent his childhood with his father James and now-dead older brother Chance, Court watches as his father is being interrogated by FBI-type agents, whom he deduced to be Carmichael's foot soldiers, about his whereabouts. James senses his son is watching and rhetorically tells him to "turn his ass around and get the hell out of here". Court interprets this as a warning, and later finds out that he was also being hunted by the now-reorganized Autonomous Asset Program. He decides to go to Harvey Point in North Carolina, the training ground of the AAP, to find out more answers about the sanction.

Meanwhile, Shoal, who is now part of King's investigative team on Gentry, has procured evidence that a Middle Eastern proxy force has been assisting in the hunt for the Gray Man, which was illegal by law. Jordan Mayes intercepts the incriminating video from Shoal's e-mail and presents it to Carmichael, after which the latter reveals everything about his secret pact with Kaz. Distraught, Mayes leaves the room. Later, Shoal is killed by the Saudi assassins under Carmichael's orders.

Mayes later arranges a clandestine meeting with Brewer, who was also confused about the new players in the hunt for Gentry, and tells her about what Carmichael told him, as well as revealing the truth behind Operation Back Blast. Mayes wants to take this matter to the Department of Justice, but the Saudi Arabian assassins later arrive and attack them. Now having the leverage in order for her to run the CIA and force Carmichael out for his excessive power, Brewer intentionally crashes her car into a nearby hill, killing Mayes and wounding herself. She calls Carmichael and persuades him to call off the advancing Saudi assassins and that she is still an asset to his operation.

Arriving at Harvey Point, Gentry finds his old AAP training ground to be empty and abandoned. Later, he receives a call from King, who tells him that she had fulfilled her promise of going to Tel Aviv and meeting with Alvey, and later reveals that he really killed the wrong guy in Trieste six years ago.

Hawthorn had been compromised and was given time to escape by a fellow Pakistani colleague in Al Qaeda in the Serbian safehouse in Trieste. It was revealed that Gentry killed Hawthorn as he is entering the Pakistani's room, mistaking him as the Al Qaeda gunman. He ends up rescuing the Pakistani, who is revealed to be another deep-penetration agent who according to the Mossad is the one who discovered his rival's identity and who lured Hawthorn into his ruse to kill him.

Having discovered the core reason for the shoot-on-sight sanction, Gentry becomes suicidal for his failure. This was interrupted when Hightower arrives at the old AAP training facility and tells Gentry to call Hanley, who has become their de facto boss. Hanley assigns a mission to him and Hightower: to hunt down the Saudi Arabian proxy force of assassins controlled by Carmichael, in order to force him to step down from the CIA. They accept the mission and later head back to D.C. Using Gentry as bait, he and Hightower lure the Saudi assassins to the hotel where they are staying and kill them all. When Kaz finds out about the murders, he panics; Carmichael urges him to go to his fortress-like safehouse which doubles as the headquarters for the Gentry hunt in order to clean up their mess.

This was discovered by Hanley, who relays this information to Gentry and Hightower; he assigns them on a new mission to bring Carmichael in. Gentry decides to siege the heavily guarded safehouse on his own. He takes Carmichael, Kaz and the surviving members of the Violator Working Group hostage in the conference room. Later, he releases the VWG members and leaves himself alone with Carmichael and Kaz, trying but failing to glean any more information.

Meanwhile, the JSOC operatives had been preparing for an assault at the safehouse in order to rescue Carmichael and Kaz and kill Gentry, bypassing the authorities of the FBI Hostage Rescue Team. On the other hand, King, having obtained more information about Back Blast and using it to prevent Gentry from killing Carmichael and Kaz for revenge, persuades him to let him in the safehouse and to reveal the disturbing truth about the operation.

It was revealed that Carmichael personally sent Gentry to rescue the Pakistani deep-penetration agent, who turned out to be Kaz, in Trieste, instead of the Israeli one, Hawthorn. He did not know that Hawthorn, who has more operational power in Al Qaeda than Kaz, was there, and as a result, Gentry accidentally killed him. A full year after the operation, a photo of Gentry with Hawthorn's dead body in the safehouse was clandestinely sent by Kaz through back channels to the Mossad, prompting Carmichael to sacrifice Gentry by issuing the shoot-on-sight directive in order to prevent Israeli intelligence from interviewing him about Hawthorn's death. Since then, Kaz has been running Carmichael in CIA, influencing every decision which in turn would benefit his home country.

This revelation infuriates Carmichael, but by then the JSOC operatives had breached the safehouse. Gentry takes King with him and leaves Carmichael and Kaz to kill each other, giving them a submachine gun. The two enemies now wrestle for control of the weapon. Carmichael later gains the upper hand and shoots Kaz dead just as the JSOC forces storm the conference room and shoot Carmichael dead as well.

Gentry and King then proceed to the attic of the safehouse, where he leaves King and escapes from the JSOC operatives by an experimental ground-to-air retrieval device that keeps him suspended in the night sky, until he was rescued by Hightower and Chris Travers, one of Hanley's SAD men, in a CIA aircraft. Once aboard, they make themselves disappear by parachuting out of the plane and crashing it to the Allegheny Mountains.

Two weeks later, Hanley is now Acting Director of the National Clandestine Service. A few days later, he offers Gentry a contractual job back in the agency similar to his work as the Gray Man, which he accepts; he then gives him his first assignment back in the CIA: in Hong Kong.

Characters 

 Courtland "Court" Gentry: freelance assassin (The Gray Man), ex-Special Activities Division (Ground Branch) paramilitary operations officer (call sign Sierra Six), ex-CIA Autonomous Asset Program operative (code name Violator)
 Catherine King: The Washington Post senior investigative reporter
 Andy Shoal: The Washington Post Metro (cops) reporter
 Denny Carmichael: Director of National Clandestine Service, CIA
 Jordan Mayes: Assistant Director of National Clandestine Service, CIA
 Matthew Hanley: Director of Special Activities Division, CIA
 Suzanne Brewer: Senior Officer, Programs and Plans, CIA
 Zack Hightower: Former CIA Special Activities Division (Ground Branch) paramilitary operations officer (call sign Sierra One), Court Gentry's former team leader
 Chris Travers:  Special Activities Division (Ground Branch) paramilitary operations officer, CIA
 Jenner: Special Activities Division (Ground Branch) paramilitary operations officer, CIA
 Max Ohlhauser: Former Chief Council, CIA
 Leland Babbitt: Director of Townsend Government Services
 Menachem Aurbach: Director of Mossad (Israeli Intelligence)
 Yanis Alvey: Senior officer in Mossad (Israeli Intelligence)
 Murquin Al-Kazaz ("Kaz"): Washington, D.C., Station Chief – Saudi Arabia General Intelligence Presidency (Saudi Intelligence)
 Dakota: Joint Special Operations Command – Special Mission Unit team leader

References 

The Gray Man
2016 American novels
American thriller novels
Berkley Books books